Roderick Stewart Booker (born September 4,  1958) is an American former professional baseball utility player, who played shortstop, second base, and third base. He spent five seasons in Major League Baseball (MLB) for the St. Louis Cardinals (–) and Philadelphia Phillies (–).

References

External links

1958 births
Living people
Major League Baseball second basemen
Major League Baseball third basemen
Major League Baseball shortstops
St. Louis Cardinals players
Philadelphia Phillies players
Baseball players from California
California Golden Bears baseball players
Pasadena High School (California) alumni
Arkansas Travelers players
Louisville Redbirds players
Orlando Twins players
Toledo Mud Hens players
Tucson Toros players
Visalia Oaks players